The Zebra Kid is a ring name used by several professional wrestlers:
Lenny Montana (Leonard Passafaro, 1926–1992), American actor and wrestler, appeared as Zebra Kid in 1951–54 and 1961
Billy Sandow (1884–1972), American wrestler and promoter, appeared as Zebra Kid in 1951
Earl Patrick Freeman (Paddy Ryan, 1932–1989), Canadian wrestler
Roy Bevis (born 1981), British wrestler
The Blue Meanie (Brian Heffron, born 1973), American wrestler
John Saracco (born 1984), American wrestler wrestles as Zebra Kid 2017-present